Kenneth Adams MacAfee, Sr. (August 31, 1929 – July 4, 2007) was an American football end in the National Football League (NFL) for the New York Giants, the Philadelphia Eagles, and the Washington Redskins.  He played college football at the University of Alabama.  He is the father of College Football Hall of Fame tight end Ken MacAfee.

MacAfee died on July 4, 2007.

See also
 Alabama Crimson Tide football yearly statistical leaders

References

External links

1929 births
2007 deaths
American football tight ends
Alabama Crimson Tide football players
New York Giants players
People from Easton, Massachusetts
Philadelphia Eagles players
Players of American football from Massachusetts
Sportspeople from Brockton, Massachusetts
Washington Redskins players